Petr Čoupek (born 10 May 1982 in Brno) is a Czech former football defender who played for several Gambrinus liga teams. He has represented his country at under-21 level.

References

External links
 
 

1982 births
Living people
Czech footballers
Czech Republic youth international footballers
Czech Republic under-21 international footballers
Czech First League players
Bayer 04 Leverkusen players
Bayer 04 Leverkusen II players
FC Baník Ostrava players
Expatriate footballers in Germany
1. FC Slovácko players
FC Zbrojovka Brno players
Footballers from Brno
Association football defenders
1. HFK Olomouc players